The Patriotic Union (VU) is a liberal-conservative political party in Liechtenstein. The VU is one of the two major political parties in Liechtenstein, along with the national-conservative Progressive Citizens' Party. The VU is the more liberal of the two parties, advocating constitutional monarchy and greater democracy. It is led by Thomas Zwiefelhofer and has ten members in the Landtag.

History
The Patriotic Union was formed by the 1936 merger of the Christian-Social People's Party (VP) with the minor party Liechtenstein Homeland Service (LHD). While the VP was the larger party, following the merger it was members of the LHD who took prominent positions in the leadership of the new party.

After decades of being the second party to the Progressive Citizens' Party (FBP), the VU became the largest party in the Landtag for the first time as a result of the 1970 elections. Although it lost the 1974 elections to the FBP, it won the 1978 elections and retained its Landtag majority until February 1993. However, early elections in October 1993 saw it regain its majority, which it held until 2001. After winning the 2009 elections the party lost the 2013 elections to the FBP.

Electoral history

Landtag elections

Leaders

Notes

References

External links
  

1936 establishments in Liechtenstein
Catholic political parties
Christian democratic parties in Europe
Political parties in Liechtenstein
Political parties established in 1936